George Davidson may refer to:

 George Davidson (athlete) (1898–1948), New Zealand track and field athlete
 George Davidson (attorney) (born 1942), American attorney
 George Davidson (basketball) (1925–2017), American basketball coach and player
 George Davidson (cricketer) (1866–1899), Derbyshire cricketer
 George Davidson (footballer) (1872–1945), Australian rules footballer who played with South Melbourne
 George Davidson (geographer) (1825–1911), English-American geographer
 George Davidson (minister) (1855–1936), Presbyterian minister in South Australia
 George Davidson (politician) (1850–1935), Northwest Territories MLA
 George Forrester Davidson (1909–1995), Canadian civil servant
 George Ramsay Davidson (1801–1890), Scottish minister
 GeorgeNotFound (born 1995), English internet personality
 George Davidson Grant (1870–1915), Canadian politician
 George Davidson Todd (1856–1929), mayor of Louisville, Kentucky

See also
George Davison (disambiguation)

George Davidson (Dreamwastaken)